The Mepkin Abbey Botanical Garden (3,200 acres) is a natural area and botanical garden located on the grounds of Mepkin Abbey, a Trappist monastery located at 1098 Mepkin Abbey Road, Moncks Corner, South Carolina. The garden is open to the public daily except Mondays.

The grounds began as the Mepkin Plantation, home of American patriot Henry Laurens. The house itself was burned by the British and again by the Union Army in the Civil War. Today's garden was established as landscape gardens on the country estate of noted publisher Henry R. Luce and his wife Clare Boothe Luce (who are buried on the site). The grounds feature live oaks and a camellia garden designed by landscape architect Loutrel Briggs.

See also
 List of botanical gardens in the United States

External links

 Mepkin Abbey Official Website

Botanical gardens in South Carolina
Protected areas of Berkeley County, South Carolina
Trappist Order